Scaptia is a genus of horse-fly in the tribe Scionini.

Species
Scaptia abdominalis (Ricardo, 1917)
Scaptia alpina Mackerras, 1960
Scaptia arnhemensis Lessard, 2012
Scaptia auranticula Mackerras, 1960
Scaptia aurata (Macquart, 1838)
Scaptia aureovestita (Ferguson & Henry, 1920)
Scaptia auriflua (Donovan, 1805)
Scaptia aurifulga Lessard, 2011
Scaptia aurinigra Lessard, 2013
Scaptia aurinotum Mackerras, 1960
Scaptia barbara Mackerras, 1960
Scaptia berylensis (Ricardo, 1915)
Scaptia beyonceae Lessard, 2011
Scaptia bifasciata (Enderlein, 1922)
Scaptia binotata Latreille, 1811
Scaptia brevirostris (Macquart, 1850)
Scaptia divisa (Walker, 1850)
Scaptia fulgida (Ferguson & Henry, 1920)
Scaptia hardyi Mackerras, 1960
Scaptia jacksonii (Macquart, 1838)
Scaptia jaksoniensis (Guerin, 1831)
Scaptia minuscula Mackerras, 1960
Scaptia monticola Mackerras, 1960
Scaptia norrisi Mackerras, 1960
Scaptia orba Mackerras, 1960
Scaptia patula (Walker, 1848)
Scaptia plana (Walker, 1848)
Scaptia pulchra (Ricardo, 1915)
Scaptia similis Mackerras, 1960
Scaptia testacea (Macquart, 1838)
Scaptia tricolor (Walker, 1848)

References

Tabanidae
Tabanoidea genera
Diptera of South America
Diptera of Australasia